Thummalapalle is a village in Krishna district of the Indian state of Andhra Pradesh. It is located in Nandivada mandal of Gudivada revenue division.

References

External links 

Villages in Krishna district